is Japanese professional association football club based in Tendo, Yamagata. The club currently playing in J2 League, the Japanese second tier of professional football.

Name origin 
Montedio is a coined word combining the Italian word for "mountain" (Monte) and the word for "God" (Dio).

History 
The club based in Tsuruoka was founded in 1984 as NEC Yamagata Soccer Club. It gained the promotion to the Japan Football League (former) in 1994. After renaming itself as Montedio Yamagata in 1996, it has been playing in J. League Division 2 since its inaugural 1999 season.

On 30 November 2008, they were promoted to J. League Division 1 for the first time. They achieved their highest league placing of 13th in 2010. However, in 2011, two strong rental players from Kashima Antlers go back to their own team and this influences the team in a bad way to lead to be relegated back to J.League Division 2 at the end of 2011. On top of that, main reason for going back to Division 2 is because of many injured players in the middle of the season. At the end of the season, the manager, Shinji Kobayashi, stepped down even though many fans glorified his accomplishment for the past 4 years.

Yamagata returned to the J1 after spending three seasons in the J2 by winning the J1/J2 promotion playoff final in 2014. They returned to the J2 for the 2016 season, having spent only one season at the J1. The club is currently playing their 8th consecutive season in the J2 on 2023.

Record as J.League member 

Key

Current squad 
As of 2 March 2023.

Out on loan

Club officials
For the 2023 season.

Managerial history

General managers 
 Shigetoshi Nakaigawa 1986–1997, 2007–2019

Honours 

Emperor's Cup:
Runners-up: 2014
Tohoku Soccer League (4):
Champions: 1990, 1991, 1992, 1993
Yamagata Prefecture League (1):
Champions: 1989

Award winners 
The following players have won the awards while at NECY/Montedio:

JFL Best XI
 Daiki Wakamatsu (1998)
 Yukihiko Sato (1998)

Kit evolution

Rivalries

Ōu Honsen (Dewa derby) 

NEC Yamagata and TDK first met in 1990 in old Tohoku regional football league. The two clubs have been based in former Dewa Province, and their rivalry is renamed as Ōu Honsen (奥羽本戦) after the Japan Railways Ōu Main Line (奥羽本線)  in 2021.

 Battle of Ōshū

References

External links 
 Official Site
Montedio Squad

 
J.League clubs
Football clubs in Japan
Association football clubs established in 1984
Sports teams in Yamagata Prefecture
Tendō, Yamagata
1984 establishments in Japan
Japan Football League (1992–1998) clubs